This is an incomplete list of software that are licensed under the GNU Affero General Public License, in alphabetical order.
 Akvo platform - data platform for Sustainable Development Goals and international development tracking
 Alaveteli
 Ampache - web based audio/video streaming application
 Anki - the desktop version is under GNU AGPL, the Android version is under GPLv3.0
 Bacula
 BEdita 3 Open
 BerkeleyDB - a b-tree NoSQL database developed by Oracle, the open source license is under GNU AGPL
 Bitwarden password management service server code
 Booktype - online book production platform
 CiviCRM
 CKAN - data management system
 Co-Ment - online text annotation and collaborative writing
 Diaspora
 EdX
 Evercam - Camera Management Software
 Feng Office Community Edition
 FreeJ
 FreePBX
 Frei0r
 Friendica
 Genenetwork
 Genode - MicroKernel based Operating System Framework
 Ghostscript
 Gitorious
 GlobaLeaks
 GNUnet - Internet-like anonymous peer-to-peer network stack
 Grafana
 Grafana Tempo
 Grafana Loki
 Humhub - Social Network Software
 Instructure Canvas
 iText
 Kune - collaborative social network
 Launchpad
 LibreTime radio automation server
 Libbitcoin 
 lichess
 logseq - a knowledge management software
 Loomio
 Mastodon (software)
 Mattermost server code
 MediaGoblin
 Minds
 Minio
 MongoDB - until late 2018, when they switched to SSPL
 MuPDF - a lightweight and high-quality pdf reader developed by Artifex Software Inc
 Naeon
 Nextcloud - private cloud software
 Nightscout
 OnlyOffice - MS Office compatible free software office suite
 Opa - a web application programming language
 OpenBroadcaster
 OpenBTS
 OpenCog
 Open Library
 OpenRemote - IoT Middleware
 ownCloud
 PeerTube
 PikoPixel - pixel-art editor
 plausible.io
 POV-Ray
 pretix
 Proxmox Virtual Environment - a server virtualization management platform
 Public Whip
 RapidMiner - data mining suite, old versions are released as AGPL
 RStudio
 ScyllaDB - Cassandra-like NoSQL DB
 Seafile
 Searx
 SecureDrop
 Seeks
 Servoy
 Signal (software) server code
 Snap! (programming language)
 snyk.io
 Sones GraphDB
 StatusNet
 stet
 SugarCRM (community edition)
 Wakanda Server
 Wikidot
 Wiki.js - A wiki application built on Node.js
 WURFL
 XBlock
 YottaDB Hierarchical key-value NoSQL database. All software under the YottaDB project (e.g., Octo for SQL access) is also AGPL v3.
 Zarafa (software)

References 

Free and open-source software licenses
Lists of software